Hugo Vondřejc (12 August 1910 – 15 November 1979) was a Czech water polo player. He competed in the men's tournament at the 1936 Summer Olympics.

References

1910 births
1979 deaths
Czechoslovak male water polo players
Olympic water polo players of Czechoslovakia
Water polo players at the 1936 Summer Olympics
Place of birth missing